The 2011 Island Games on the Isle of Wight, England, was the 6th edition in which a women's football (soccer) tournament was played at the multi-games competition. It was contested by 10 teams.

Participants

Group Phase

Group A

To achieve parity with the other groups, which were composed of three teams, the results of the group's bottom team were expunged from the table for the purpose of calculating which teams would advance to the semi-finals and which would play in the matches for fifth and seventh places. The revised table was thus :

Group B

Group C

Placement play-off matches

9th place match

7th place match

5th place match

Final stage

Bracket

Semifinals

Third place match

Final

Final rankings

See also
Men's Football at the 2011 Island Games

External links
Official 2011 website

2011
Women
Island
Island
2011